Osong Public Health and Research Perspectives (PHRP) is a peer reviewed open access journal published bimonthly. It is published by the Korea Disease Control and Prevention Agency (KDCA). PHRP covers articles mostly in the areas of public health, putting emphasis on emerging infectious disease, vaccinology, zoonotic disease, intractable and rare diseases, etc. The journal is indexed by Pubmed Central, Scopus, DOAJ and KCI.

History 
Osong Public Health and Research Perspectives was found in 2010 by Korea Centers for Disease Control and Prevention (currently Korea Disease Control and Prevention Agency).

Abstracting and indexing 
The journal is currently indexed in Pubmed Central, Scopus, DOAJ and KCI.

References

External links 
 Official Website

Bimonthly journals
English-language journals
2010 establishments in South Korea
Publications established in 2010
Academic journals of South Korea
Public health journals
Open access journals